Langbank railway station serves the village of Langbank in Renfrewshire, Scotland.

Services 
Most journeys to Wemyss Bay require a change at Port Glasgow. On Sundays, there is an hourly service in each direction (westbound to Gourock).

References

External links
Video footage of Langbank Station

Railway stations in Renfrewshire
Former Caledonian Railway stations
Railway stations in Great Britain opened in 1841
SPT railway stations
Railway stations served by ScotRail